Karl-Erik Nilsson (4 January 1922 – 14 December 2017) was a light-heavyweight (-87 kg) Greco-Roman wrestler from Sweden. He competed at the 1948, 1952 and 1956 Olympics and won one gold (in 1948) and two bronze medals. He won another bronze medal at the 1955 World Wrestling Championships. He died in December 2017.

References

External links

Karl-Erik Nilsson's profile at databaseOlympics
Karl-Erik Nilsson's profile at Sports Reference.com

1922 births
2017 deaths
Olympic wrestlers of Sweden
Wrestlers at the 1948 Summer Olympics
Wrestlers at the 1952 Summer Olympics
Wrestlers at the 1956 Summer Olympics
Swedish male sport wrestlers
Olympic gold medalists for Sweden
Olympic bronze medalists for Sweden
Olympic medalists in wrestling
World Wrestling Championships medalists
Medalists at the 1956 Summer Olympics
Medalists at the 1952 Summer Olympics
Medalists at the 1948 Summer Olympics
People from Eslöv Municipality